Ravenet is a surname. Notable people with the surname include:

Simon François Ravenet (1706–1764), French engraver
Simon Jean François Ravenet (1737–1821), French-born Italian engraver, Simon Françios's son, later known as Gian-Francesco Ravenet 
Juan Ravenet (1766-c.1821), Italian-born Spanish painter and engraver, Gian-Franceso's son, originally known as Giovanni Ravenet
Domingo Ravenet (1905-1969), Spanish-born Cuban painter and sculptor.

References